Gabriela Henrique Soares (born November 9, 1993) is a Brazilian artistic gymnast. She was the alternate gymnast for team Brazil at the 2010 World Artistic Gymnastics Championships.

References

1993 births
Living people
Brazilian female artistic gymnasts
Gymnasts at the 2011 Pan American Games
Pan American Games competitors for Brazil
Sportspeople from Rio de Janeiro (city)
21st-century Brazilian women
20th-century Brazilian women